Greg Holmes may refer to:

 Greg Holmes (cricketer) (born 1993), Welsh cricketer
 Greg Holmes (rugby union) (born 1983), Australian rugby union footballer
 Greg Holmes (tennis) (born 1963), American tennis player